Yeísmo (literally "Y-ism") is a distinctive feature of certain dialects of the Spanish language, characterized by the loss of the traditional palatal lateral approximant phoneme  (written ) and its merger into the phoneme  (written ), usually realized as a palatal approximant or affricate. It is an example of delateralization.

In other words,  and  represent the same sound  when  is present. The term  comes from one of the Spanish names for the letter . Over 90% of Spanish speakers exhibit this phonemic merger. Similar mergers exist in other languages, such as French, Italian, Hungarian, Catalan, Basque, Portuguese or Galician, with different social considerations.

Pronunciation

In dialects where  is maintained, its pronunciation involves constriction in both the alveolar or post-alveolar area and in the palatal area. Its duration when between vowels is 20% longer than that of a simple , and the formant transitions to the following vowel are nearly twice as long. Replacing  with  can thus be considered a type of lenition since it results in a lower degree of closure.

and  

The  sound itself may have originated in Argentina and Uruguay as an influence of local Amerindian languages on the colonial pronunciation of the Spanish language typical of the area's inhabitants of that time, a pronunciation that persisted after the mass immigration of post-colonial Italians and Spaniards into the region which otherwise transformed the demographics and affected aspects of the Spanish language there, including most noticeably intonation. Prior to this post-colonial mass immigration wave, as most other South American countries, their populations were similarly composed of a mestizo majority (those of mixed Spaniard and Amerindian ancestry). In Buenos Aires the sound  has recently been devoiced to  among younger speakers.

In the Ecuadorian Sierra region spanning from the Imbabura province to the Chimborazo Province, by contrast, where the pronunciation of /ʎ/ as  survives among the majority population of colonial-descended mestizos, the sibilant has not merged as in Argentina and Uruguay, and so a distinction is also maintained but with  representing  (rather than the original Spanish  sound) and  representing . This three-way distinction is still present in the Kichwa of more southerly regions, such as the Azuay province, which uses the graphemes <zh>, <ll>, and <y> to distinguish between these phonemes. In the orthography of several Ecuadorian dialects of Quichua, under the influence of the orthography of Ecuadorian Andean Spanish, the grapheme  is also used to represent the  sound.

Parts of Colombia, like the Andean regions of Ecuador, maintain a distinction between  representing  and  representing . This type of distinction is found in southern Antioquia Department and the southeast end of Norte de Santander Department.

Extension of  

By 1989, several traditionally non- areas, such as Bogotá and much of Spain and the Canaries, had begun rapidly adopting , in the timespan of little more than a single generation. In areas where  is variable,  is lost more often in rapid and casual speech.

 has begun appearing in the speech of Ecuador's middle and upper classes.

In Spain, most of the northern half of the country and several areas in the south, particularly in rural Huelva, Seville, Cadiz, and part of the Canaries used to retain the distinction, but  has spread throughout the country, and the distinction is now lost in most of Spain, particularly outside areas in linguistic contact with Catalan and Basque.

These include the valley of Nansa, Tudanca, and Cabuérniga, all in Cantabria.

Minimal pairs
 produces homophony in a number of cases. For example, the following word pairs sound the same when pronounced by speakers of dialects with yeísmo, but they are minimal pairs in regions with the distinction:

 ("beech tree" / "that there be") ~  ("he/she/it finds")
 ("he/she/it fell") ~  ("he/she/it became silent")
 ("pit, hole") ~  ("pot")
 ("berry") /  ("that he/she/it go") ~  ("fence")

The relatively low frequency of both  and  makes confusion unlikely. However, orthographic mistakes are common (for example, writing  instead of ). This new form ended up becoming the usual pronunciation, even for native Mallorcans.

Similar phenomena in other languages

Romance languages
In standard French, historical  turned into , but the spelling  was preserved, hence  (originally ),  (originally ).
Romanesco and many Northern and Central dialects of Italy have  or  corresponding to standard Italian .

Other
In Hungarian,  in most dialects turned into , but the spelling  was preserved, hence  .
In Swedish,  turned into  in word-initial positions, but the spelling  was preserved, hence  .

See also 
History of the Spanish language
List of phonetics topics
Phonological history of Spanish coronal fricatives ( and )

References

Bibliography

Further reading

External links 
 Yeísmo y su desarrollo en España 
 Lleísmo

Spanish phonology
Lateral consonants